Milun Marović (15 September 1947 – 19 October 2009) was a Serbian geologist, university professor and basketball player.

Career
Marović spent entire playing career with Radnički Belgrade of the Yugoslav League. Marović was a member of Radnički teams that won the Yugoslav League in the 1972–73 season and the Yugoslav Cup in 1976. He played in the 1977 FIBA European Cup Winners' Cup final.

Marović was a member of the Yugoslavia national team that competed in the men's tournament at the 1972 Summer Olympics.

References

External links
 
 Profile at kosarka.bz

1947 births
2009 deaths
Basketball players from Čačak
Basketball players at the 1972 Summer Olympics
Burials at Belgrade New Cemetery
Centers (basketball)
Competitors at the 1971 Mediterranean Games
FIBA EuroBasket-winning players
Olympic basketball players of Yugoslavia
Mediterranean Games gold medalists for Yugoslavia
BKK Radnički players
Serbian geologists
Serbian men's basketball players
Serbian basketball executives and administrators
University of Belgrade alumni
Yugoslav men's basketball players
1974 FIBA World Championship players
Mediterranean Games medalists in basketball
Yugoslav geologists